The Indian Premier League (IPL) (Also known as TATA IPL due to sponsorship reason) is a men's T20 franchise cricket league in India. It is annually contested by ten teams based in seven cities and three states. The league was founded by the Board of Control for Cricket in India (BCCI) in 2007. Brijesh Patel is the incumbent chairman of IPL. It is usually held annually in summer across India between March to May and has an exclusive window in the ICC Future Tours Programme.

The IPL is the most-attended cricket league in the world. In 2014, it was ranked sixth by average attendance among all sports leagues. In 2010, the IPL became the first sporting event in the world to be broadcast live on YouTube. According to BCCI, the 2015 IPL season contributed  to the GDP of the Indian economy. 

So far there have been fifteen seasons of the IPL tournament. The current IPL title holder franchise is Gujarat Titans, winning the 2022 season which was their debut season.

History

Background 
The Indian Cricket League (ICL) was founded in 2007, with funding provided by Zee Entertainment Enterprises. The ICL was not recognised by the Board of Control for Cricket in India (BCCI) or the International Cricket Council (ICC) and the BCCI were not pleased with its committee members joining the ICL executive board. To prevent players from joining the ICL, the BCCI increased the prize money in their own domestic tournaments and also imposed lifetime bans on players joining the ICL, which was considered a rebel league by the board.

Foundation 

On 13 September 2007, on the back of India's victory at the 2007 T20 World Cup, BCCI announced a franchise-based Twenty20 cricket competition called Indian Premier League. The first season was slated to start in April 2008, in a "high-profile ceremony" in New Delhi. BCCI vice-president Lalit Modi, who spearheaded the IPL effort, spelled out the details of the tournament including its format, the prize money, franchise revenue system and squad composition rules. It was also revealed that the IPL would be run by a seven-man governing council composed of former India players and BCCI officials and that the top two teams of the IPL would qualify for that year's Champions League Twenty20. Modi also clarified that they had been working on the idea for two years and that the IPL was not started as a "knee-jerk reaction" to the ICL. The league's format was similar to that of the Premier League of England and the NBA in the United States.

In order to decide the owners for the new league, an auction was held on 24 January 2008 with the total base prices of the franchises costing around $400 million. At the end of the auction, the winning bidders were announced, as well as the cities the teams would be based in: Bangalore, Chennai, Delhi, Hyderabad, Jaipur, Kolkata, Mohali, and Mumbai. In the end, the franchises were all sold for a total of $723.59 million. The Indian Cricket League soon folded in 2008.

Players of Pakistan are not allowed to take part in the league since the 2008 Mumbai terrorist attacks, due to the involvement of Pakistan in that attack. As a result of the attack, 166 people died and 238 were injured. The odious attack widespread angered many Indians, resulting in a total ban of Pakistani players in the IPL.

Expansions and terminations 

On 21 March 2010, two new franchises – Pune Warriors India and Kochi Tuskers Kerala – joined the league before the fourth season in 2011. Sahara Adventure Sports Group bought the Pune franchise for $370 million while Rendezvous Sports World bought the Kochi franchise for $333.3 million. However, one year later, on 11 November 2011, it was announced that the Kochi Tuskers Kerala side would be terminated following the side breaching the BCCI's terms of conditions.

Then, on 14 September 2012, following the team not being able to find new owners, the BCCI announced that the 2009 champions, the Deccan Chargers, would be terminated. The next month, on 25 October, an auction was held to see who would be the owner of the replacement franchise, with Sun TV Network winning the bid for the Hyderabad franchise. The team would be named Sunrisers Hyderabad.

Pune Warriors India withdrew from the IPL on 21 May 2013 over financial differences with the BCCI. The franchise was officially terminated by the BCCI, on 26 October 2013, on account of the franchise failing to provide the necessary bank guarantee.

On 14 June 2015, it was announced that two-time champions, Chennai Super Kings, and the inaugural season champions, Rajasthan Royals, would be suspended for two seasons following their role in a spot-fixing and betting scandal. Then, on 8 December 2015, following an auction, it was revealed that Pune and Rajkot would replace Chennai and Rajasthan for two seasons. The two teams were the Rising Pune Supergiant and the Gujarat Lions.

The venue for the 2020 season was moved due to the COVID-19 pandemic and games were played in the United Arab Emirates.
In August 2021, the BCCI announced that two new franchises would join the league starting from the 2022 season. It was also announced that the franchises would be based in two of the six cities shortlisted by the BCCI; Ahmedabad, Lucknow, Cuttack, Guwahati, Ranchi and Dharamshala. In a closed bidding held on 25 October, RPSG Group and CVC Capital won bids for the two teams. The teams were subsequently named Lucknow Super Giants and Gujarat Titans.

Administration 

IPL's headquarter is situated inside the Cricket centre next to Wankhede Stadium in Churchgate, Mumbai. The IPL Governing Council is responsible for all the functions of the tournament.

The members are:
 Brijesh Patel– Chairman
 Jay Shah – BCCI secretary
 Arun Singh Dhumal – BCCI treasurer
 Avishek Dalmiya - IPL governing council member
 MKhairul Jamal Majumdar – Apex council member
 Pragyan Ojha – Indian Cricketers' Association's representative
 Alka Rehani Bhardwaj – Comptroller and auditor general of India nominee

Organisation

Player acquisition, squad composition and salaries 
A team can acquire players through any of the three ways: the annual player auction, trading players with other teams during the trading windows, and signing replacements for unavailable players. Players sign up for the auction and also set their base price, and are bought by the franchise that bids the highest for them. Unsold players at the auction are eligible to be signed up as replacement signings. In the trading windows, a player can only be traded with his consent, with the franchise paying the difference if any between the old and new contracts. If the new contract is worth more than the older one, the difference is shared between the player and the franchise selling the player. There are generally three trading windowstwo before the auction and one after the auction but before the start of the tournament. Players cannot be traded outside the trading windows or during the tournament, whereas replacements can be signed before or during the tournament.

Some of the team composition rules (as of 2020 season) are as follows:
 The squad strength must be between 18 and 25 players, with a maximum of 8 overseas players.
 Salary cap of the entire squad must not exceed .
 Under-19 players cannot be picked unless they have previously played first-class or List A cricket.
 A team can play a maximum of 4 overseas players in their playing eleven.

The term of a player contract is one year, with the franchise having the option to extend the contract by one or two years. Since the 2014 season, the player contracts are denominated in the Indian rupee, before which the contracts were in U.S. dollars. Overseas players can be remunerated in the currency of the player's choice at the exchange rate on either the contract due date or the actual date of payment. This received significant opposition from franchise owners who complained that richer franchises were "luring players with under-the-table deals" following which the IPL decided to include domestic players in the player auction.

According to a 2015 survey by Sporting Intelligence and ESPN The Magazine, the average IPL salary when pro-rated is 4.33 million per year, the second highest among all sports leagues in the world. Since the players in the IPL are only contracted for the duration of the tournament (less than two months), the weekly IPL salaries are extrapolated pro rata to obtain an average annual salary, unlike other sports leagues in which players are contracted by a single team for the entire year.

Match rules 
IPL games incorporate television timeouts and However, a penalty may be imposed if the umpires find teams misusing this privilege. Each team is given a 2:50 minute "strategic timeout" during each innings; one must be taken by the bowling team between the ends of the 6th and 9th overs, and one by the batting team between the ends of the 13th and 16th overs.

Since the 2018 season, the Umpire decision review system is being used in all IPL matches, allowing each team two chances to review an on-field umpire's decision per innings.

Prize money 
The other teams are not awarded any prize money. The IPL rules mandate that half of the prize money must be distributed among the players.

Teams

Current teams

Defunct teams

Timeline

Tournament seasons and results 

With five titles, Mumbai Indians are the most successful team in the league's history in terms of the number of titles won. The Chennai Super Kings have won four titles, the Kolkata Knight Riders have won two, and four other teams, Rajasthan Royals, Deccan Chargers, Sunrisers Hyderabad and Gujarat Titans have won the title once.

The current champions are the Gujarat Titans who defeated the Rajasthan Royals  by 7 wickets in the final of the 2022 season to secure their first title.

Performance in the IPL by title 

† Team now defunct.

IPL season results

Teams' performances 

† Team now defunct.

League stage positions 

† Team now defunct.

Awards

Orange Cap 
The Orange Cap is awarded to the top run-scorer in the IPL during a season. It is an ongoing competition with the leader wearing the cap throughout the tournament until the final game, with the eventual winner keeping the cap for the season. Latest winner – Jos Buttler – 863 Runs (2022).

Purple Cap 
The Purple Cap is awarded to the top wicket-taker in the IPL during a season. It is an ongoing competition with the leader wearing the cap throughout the tournament until the final game, with the eventual winner keeping the cap for the season. Latest winner – Yuzvendra Chahal – 27 wickets (2022).

Most Valuable Player 
The award was called the "man of the tournament" until the 2012 season. The IPL introduced the Most Valuable Player rating system in 2013, the leader of which would be named the "Most Valuable Player" at the end of the season. Latest winner – Jos Buttler (2022).

Fairplay Award 
The Fair Play Award is given after each season to the team with the best record of fair play. The winner is decided on the basis of the points the umpires give to the teams. After each match, the two on-field umpires, and the third umpire, scores the performance of both teams. Latest winners –Rajasthan Royals.

Emerging player award 
The award was presented for the "best under-19 player" in 2008 and "best under-23 player" in 2009 and 2010, being called "Under-23 Success of the Tournament". In 2011 and 2012, the award was known as "Rising Star of the Year", while, in 2013, it was called "Best Young Player of the Season". Since 2014, the award has been called the Emerging Player of the Year. In 2016, Mustafizur Rahman of Bangladesh was the first and only foreign player to date to win the Emerging Player of the Year award. Latest winner – Umran Malik (2022).

Most sixes award 
The award for the most sixes in a season, currently known as Unacademy Let's Crack It Sixes Award for sponsorship reasons, is presented to the batsman who hits the most sixes in a season of the IPL. English batsman Jos Buttler of the Rajasthan Royals won this award in 2022 with 45 sixes in 17 innings.

Financials

Title sponsorship 
However, the company terminated the deal in October 2015, two years before the expiry of the contract, reportedly due to the two-season suspension of Chennai and Rajasthan franchises from the league. On 4 August 2020, Vivo got out of the title sponsorship rights due to the ongoing military stand-off between India and China at the Line of Actual Control in July 2020. It was also reported that the withdrawal was a result of Vivo's market losses due to the ongoing COVID-19 situation and that it intended to return as the title sponsors for the following 3 years. Dream11 bagged the title sponsorship for the 2020 IPL for an amount of ₹222 crore. Vivo returned as the title sponsor for the 2021 IPL, but pulled out again, and was replaced by the Tata Group for the next 2 seasons. InsideSport reported that the BCCI would actually receive  for the 2022 and 2023 seasons from title sponsors. Vivo had previously agreed to pay a higher amount for the last two seasons of its sponsorship contract due to the expansion of the league from the 2022 season.

Aramco brought the rights to advertise on the Purple and Orange caps in 2022.

Payments to foreign national boards
BCCI pays 10 percent of the auctioned value of a player to their respective cricket boards. In January 2018, IPL Chairman Rajiv Shukla said that the IPL would double the amount paid to the cricket boards that made their players available for an entire season.
In 2022, Australian Cricketers' Association expressed his unhappiness on it.

Brand value 

The tournament has grown rapidly in value over the years 2016–18, as seen in a series of jumps in value from one season to the next. The IPL as a whole was valued by financial experts at US$4.16 billion in 2016, but that number grew to $5.3 billion in 2017, and $6.13 billion in 2018. A report from Duff & Phelps said that one of the contributing factors in the rapid growth of the value of the Indian Premier League was signing a new television deal with Star India Private Limited, which engaged more viewers due to the fact that the IPL was transmitted to regional channels in 8 languages, rather than the previous deal, which saw the transmissions limited to sports networks with English language commentary. The report also stated that the game continued to recover from recent controversy, stating "This IPL season has grabbed the eyeballs for all the right reasons with a relatively controversy free tournament, coupled with some scintillating on-field performances which have brought the spotlight back on the game."

According to another independent report conducted by Brand Finance, a London-based company, after the conclusion of the 2017 Indian Premier League, the IPL has seen its business value grow by 37% to an all-time high of $5.3 billion — crossing the five billion mark for the first time in a season. According to the director of the company: "Now in its 11th season, the Indian Premier League is here to stay. The league has delivered financially for the players, franchisees, sponsors and India as a whole, prompting a strong desire among a range of stakeholders to appropriately value it. To ensure continued development, management and team owners will have to explore innovative ways of engaging fans, clubs, and sponsors."

• Insurance
This insurance policy involves all the stake holders including broadcaster, ancillary services provider, sponsors, etc. for the case of any revenue losses happened due to weather, riots, etc.

Broadcasting

2008–2017: Sony Pictures Networks
The IPL's broadcast rights were originally held by a partnership between Sony Pictures Networks and World Sport Group under a ten-year contract valued at US$1.03 billion. Sony would be responsible for domestic television, while WSG would handle international distribution. The initial plan was for 20% of these proceeds to go to the IPL, 8% as prize money and 72% would be distributed to the franchisees from 2008 until 2012, after which the IPL would go public and list its shares. However, in March 2010, the IPL decided not to go public and list its shares. As of the 2016 season, Sony Max, Sony Six, and Sony ESPN served as the domestic broadcasters of the IPL; Max and Six aired broadcasts with commentary in Hindi, SIX additionally aired broadcasts in Bengali, Tamil, Kannada and Telugu, while Sony ESPN aired broadcasts in English. Sony also produced an entertainment-oriented companion talk show, Extraaa Innings T20, which featured analysis and celebrity guests.

The IPL became a major television property within India; Sony MAX typically became the most-watched television channel in the country during the tournament, and by 2016, annual advertising revenue surpassed . Viewership numbers were expected to increase further during the 2016 season due to the industry adoption of the new BARC ratings system, which also calculates rural viewership rather than only urban markets. In the 2016 season, Sony's broadcasts achieved just over 1 billion impressions (television viewership in thousands), jumping to 1.25 billion the following year.

2018–2022: Star Sports and Hotstar
On 4 September 2017, it was announced that the then-current digital rightsholder, Star India (now Disney Star), had acquired the global media rights to the IPL under a five-year contract beginning in 2018. Valued at 163.475 billion (US$2.55 billion, £1.97 billion), it is a 158% increase over the previous deal, and the most expensive broadcast rights deal in the history of cricket. The IPL sold the rights in packages for domestic television, domestic digital, and international rights; although Sony held the highest bid for domestic television, and Facebook had made a US$600 million bid for domestic digital rights (which U.S. media interpreted as a sign that the social network was interested in pursuing professional sports rights), Star was the only bidder out of the shortlist of 14 to make bids in all three categories.

Star CEO Uday Shankar stated that the IPL was a "very powerful property", and that Star would "remain very committed to make sure that the growth of sports in this country continues to be driven by the power of cricket". He went on to say that "whoever puts in that money, they put in that money because they believe in the fans of the sport. The universe of cricket fans, it tells you, continues to very healthy, continues to grow. What was paid in 2008, that was 2008. India and cricket and IPL—all three have changed dramatically in the last 10 years. It is a reflection of that." The deal led to concerns that Star India now held a monopoly on major cricket rights in the country, as it is also the rights-holder of ICC competitions and the Indian national team.

For its inaugural season, Star aimed to put a larger focus on widening the IPL's appeal with a "core" cricket audience. The network aimed to broadcast at least two hours of IPL-related programming daily from January until the start of the season, having organised televised announcements of player retention selections and new team captains. Viewership of the player auction, which featured pre- and post-auction reactions and analysis, increased six-fold to 46.5 million. In March, Star Sports broadcast Game Plan: In Your City specials from the home city of each of the IPL's franchises. Star Sports stated that its in-season coverage and studio programming would focus more on the game itself and behind-the-scenes coverage of the IPL's teams, rather than trying to incorporate irrelevant entertainment elements. The network introduced a new studio program known as The Dugout, which broadcasts coverage of matches with analysis from a panel of experts.

Star streams IPL matches in India and other markets to subscribers of its streaming service Hotstar. Matches are also available on Jio TV and Airtel TV apps on smartphones. Throughout the 2019 season, international streaming viewership on Hotstar saw records, exceeding 10 million concurrent viewers multiple times. The 2019 final broke these records, peaking at 18.6 million concurrent streaming viewers. Hotstar initially scheduled its relaunch as Disney+ Hotstar to coincide with the opening of the 2020 season. However, with the postponement of the IPL season, the relaunch was pushed back to 3 April 2020.

2023–2027: Star Sports and JioCinema 
The next cycle of IPL media rights will last from 2023 through 2027, and was put to auction. In this auction the broadcasting rights were divided into four Packages. Package A was for the domestic television rights, Package B was for the domestic digital rights. Package C was for the digital rights of 18 non-exclusive matches and Package D was for the international TV and digital rights which was further divided into four groups. On 13 June 2022, it was reported that the packages for domestic television and streaming rights had fetched at least 397.75 billion (nearly US$5.1 billion) in total, doubling the value of the 2018–2022 contract.

The next day, it was announced that Star Sports had renewed its contract for television rights by winning package A, and that a Viacom18 consortium had exclusively acquired the streaming rights by winning both Package B and C. The two contracts for Package A and B are cumulatively valued at around US$6.2 billion; with the new contracts, the IPL overtook the Premier League in English football as the second highest-valued sports media property worldwide, behind only the NFL, whose new media contracts taking effect in the 2023 season cumulatively fetched US$111 billion.

In February 2023, Viacom18 announced that it would stream the IPL for free via its digital platform JioCinema, with feeds in 12 languages (including English and regional languages), and in 4K resolution. That same month, Disney reported that its loss of the IPL had contributed to a 2.4 million net loss of Disney+ subscribers worldwide. 

As it still holds the linear pay television rights, Star Sports began taking steps to compete with JioCinema's free broadcasts, including aiming to reach at least 500 million viewers across the country (increasing from past targets of 400 million) via promotional campaigns, launching high-definition feeds of Star Sports 1 in the Tamil and Telugu languages, and announcing that its free-to-air channel Star Utsav Movies would carry 12 matches. It was anticipated that Star Sports' broadcasts may not be impacted heavily by the Jio deal, due to its existing market reach (including as rightsholder of India home matches), and viewers who may find linear television more convenient due to the bandwidth and device requirements of over-the-top (OTT) streams.

International broadcasters 

The IPL's first major international media deal was with YouTube, which streamed matches in 2010 outside of the United States (where Willow TV has held linear television rights to the IPL) under a two-year deal.

As of the 2018 season, Hotstar holds worldwide streaming rights to the IPL. In the United States, the IPL is also streamed on ESPN+, a sister to Star Sports and Hotstar via The Walt Disney Company; Hotstar had begun to be wound down in the U.S. market in September 2021, with its sports content dispersed to ESPN+.
In the media rights auction that happened in June 2022, Sky Sports and Viacom18 bagged the rights for UK, Australia-NZ and South Africa while Times Internet grabbed the rights for Middle East & North Africa and the US.

Controversies 

 
In 2010, an e-mail leaked which, according to an Economic times article, suggested that former IPL commissioner Lalit Modi helped BCCI president N Shrinivasan to buy Andrew Flintoff in auction for his team Chennai Super Kings (CSK). Many people criticized Shrinivasan's owning an IPL team due to his conflict of interest. Former BCCI president A. Muthaiah filed a lawsuit against him in supreme court, in which he claimed that Shrinivasan altered the BCCI's rules to allow himself to purchase CSK. The Lodha Committee banned CSK from the IPL for two years for illegal activities. The supreme court slammed him for buying an IPL team while serving as BCCI president, a judge commented, "How can a BCCI chief own a team?"
 
In the 2012 IPL spot-fixing case, the BCCI put a lifetime ban on Deccan Chargers Hyderabad's player TP Sudhindra and suspended four other players. In an sting operation, Pune Warriors India player Mohnish Mishra was recorded stating that IPL franchises' owners pay their players through black money. His franchise later said that Mishra apologied for his incorrect statement. On 20 May 2012, Rahul Sharma and Wayne Parnell were detained by police when they caught in a raid at rave party, which was taking place at a suburb of Mumbai, both denied taking drugs or drinking.

In the 2013 IPL spot-fixing and betting case, players Ajit Chandila, Ankeet Chavan and S Sreesanth were arrested by the Delhi police on allegations of spot fixing, and received a lifetime ban from the BCCI. Gurunath Meiyappan, Chennai Super Kings Team Principal and son-in-law of Srinivasan, was also arrested by police for illegally betting on IPL matches and passing team information to bookies. The Lodha Committee and Mudgal Committee held inquiries and made recommendations.

IPL faced heavy criticism for retaining Chinese sponsors for the 2020 season, amidst calls to boycott Chinese goods while the 2020 China–India skirmishes were ongoing.

See also 
 Sports in India - an overview of Sports culture in India 
 Women's Premier League – Indian annual franchise tournament for womens 
 Cricket in India 

 List of professional sports leagues in India 
 List of cricket leagues in India
 Surrogate advertising - Types of advertisements frequently features during IPL 
 Fantasy sport in India - Overview of Fantasy sport in India 
 Ranji Trophy - primer first-class cricket tournament of India
 List of Indian Premier League records and statistics

References

External links 
 
 
 
 
 Tournament home on ESPNcricinfo
 

 
Cricket leagues in India
Sports leagues in India
Professional sports leagues in India
Professional cricket leagues
2008 establishments in Maharashtra
Sports leagues established in 2008
Twenty20 cricket leagues
Sport in India
Organisations based in Maharashtra
Organisations based in Mumbai
Cricket in India